Charles Fingado (December 23, 1841 – 1901) was a German-born American politician who served as a member of the Wisconsin State Assembly in 1882.

Early life
Fingado was born on December 23, 1841, in Lahr, Germany. He moved to Milwaukee, Wisconsin, in 1854 and to Wauwatosa, Wisconsin, in 1856.

Career 
During the American Civil War, Fingado served with the 24th Wisconsin Volunteer Infantry Regiment and participated in the Battle of Perryville. Fingado was a member of the Wisconsin State Assembly in 1882. Previously, he held positions in Wauwatosa, serving as treasurer in 1868, supervisor from 1876 to 1880 and chairman of the board in 1880. He was a Republican.

Personal life 
On April 23, 1865, Fingado married Amalia Walther. They had six children. He died in 1901 in Wauwatosa, where he was also buried.

References

People from Lahr
German emigrants to the United States
Politicians from Milwaukee
People from Wauwatosa, Wisconsin
Republican Party members of the Wisconsin State Assembly
Wisconsin city council members
City and town treasurers in the United States
People of Wisconsin in the American Civil War
Union Army soldiers
1841 births
1901 deaths
Burials in Wisconsin
19th-century American politicians